The 1962–63 season of the European Cup Winners' Cup football club tournament was won by Tottenham Hotspur in a crushing final victory over holders Atlético Madrid. It was the first time a European cup went to an English club. The so-called "winner's curse" continued as Spurs failed to retain the cup in 1964.

Preliminary round

|}

1 Won play-off 2–1

First leg

Second leg

Botev Plovdiv won 7–4 on aggregate.

Napoli 3–3 Bangor City on aggregate.

Play-off 

Napoli won 2–1 in play-off.

First round

|}

2 Won play-off 3–1

First leg

Second leg

Botev Plovdiv won 5–0 on aggregate.

Napoli 2–2 Újpest Dózsa on aggregate.

Play-off 

Napoli won 3–1 in play-off.

Quarter-finals

|}
3 Won play-off 3–1

First leg

Second leg

Atlético Madrid won 5–1 on aggregate.

Napoli 3–3 OFK Beograd on aggregate.

Play-off 

OFK Beograd won 3–1 in play-off.

Semi-finals

|}

First leg

Second leg

Tottenham Hotspur won 5–2 on aggregate.

Atlético Madrid won 3–2 on aggregate.

Final

See also
 1962–63 European Cup
 1962–63 Inter-Cities Fairs Cup

References

External links
 Cup Winners' Cup 1962-63 Results at UEFA.com
 Cup Winners' Cup results at Rec.Sport.Soccer Statistics Foundation
 Cup Winners Cup Seasons 1962-63 – results, protocols
 website Football Archive 1962–63 Cup Winners Cup

3
UEFA Cup Winners' Cup seasons